The black and blue miner bee (Andrena nigrocaerulea) is a species of miner bee in the family Andrenidae. Another common name for this species is the blue-and-black andrena. It is found in North America.

References

Further reading

 
 

nigrocaerulea
Articles created by Qbugbot
Insects described in 1897